"The Non-Fat Yogurt" is the 71st episode of the NBC sitcom Seinfeld. It is the seventh episode of the fifth season, and first aired on November 4, 1993. The episode is a fictionalized portrayal of the 1993 New York City mayoral election in which a yogurt shop patronized by the main cast and a name tag idea suggested by Elaine become key issues.

Plot
Jerry, Elaine, George and Newman are hooked on a new frozen yogurt shop in which Kramer has invested. They are delighted by the fact that the yogurt is advertised as non-fat. Jerry swears near the shop owner's son Matthew, who then starts to swear frequently. Matthew's mother brings him over so that Jerry can explain to him that cursing is wrong, but Jerry curses again when Matthew destroys one of his cassette tapes. When Kramer notices that Jerry and Elaine have gained weight, they become suspicious that the yogurt may not be non-fat, so they send it to a laboratory for testing.

George runs into his childhood nemesis Lloyd Braun and makes a derisive nudge to Jerry. When Lloyd notices, George pretends that it is an involuntary spasm caused by an injury. George then has to fake the spasm repeatedly. Lloyd refers him to a doctor, who concludes that George is faking it. As he leaves the doctor's office, George bumps his elbow on the desk and experiences a real spasm, which worries him.

Elaine starts dating Lloyd, who works as an aide to the mayor of New York City David Dinkins, who is running for re-election against Rudy Giuliani. When Elaine suggests an idea for everyone in New York to wear name tags in public, Lloyd takes the idea to Dinkins. The idea is ridiculed, Dinkins is made a laughing stock, and Lloyd is fired. Lloyd then breaks up with Elaine but she believes it is due to her weight gain from the frozen yogurt.

Kramer, fearful of losing his investment, tries to sway a lab technician to falsify the analysis of the yogurt. They make out, and accidentally knock a sample of blood into a test tube belonging to Rudy Giuliani. This causes Giuliani's results to show he has a high level of cholesterol. Having eaten lots of supposedly non-fat frozen yogurt lately, the prospective mayor promises an investigation into the fraudulent frozen yogurt. The issue ignites voters, and Giuliani wins the election. The lab results show that the yogurt does in fact contain fat. When Jerry's local frozen yogurt shop switches to real non-fat yogurt, it tastes awful and business plummets. Matthew curses at Jerry for ruining his father's business.

Series continuity
This is the first appearance by Lloyd Braun. He was played by Peter Keleghan. Braun would reappear, played by Matt McCoy, in "The Gum" and "The Serenity Now". Meredith and Matthew previously appeared in "The Parking Space".

Production
As the episode was to air two days after the 1993 New York City mayoral election, the production crew's solution was to produce two different versions of the episode: one in which Dinkins won, and another in which Giuliani won. The plot is the same in both versions; the Giuliani version simply replaced any reference to Dinkins with a reference to Giuliani, and vice versa. The Seinfeld crew recounted that Giuliani (who was a fan of the show) and his campaign staff were immediately supportive when consulted about the episode, and they made plans to have him appear in the episode. The Dinkins camp were more reluctant to get involved, and so Phil Morris was cast as a spokesman in lieu of Dinkins himself in the Dinkins version of the episode.

Because of the short interval between the election and the airing of the episode, Giuliani's scenes had to be filmed on the morning after his victory. Both versions of the episode were included on the season five DVD.

All instances of the profanities being uttered were censored; there is no uncensored version of this episode available.

The table reading for "The Non-Fat Yogurt" was held on October 20, 1993.

References

External links 
 

Seinfeld (season 5) episodes
1993 American television episodes
Television episodes written by Larry David
Rudy Giuliani